All the Love You Cannes! (credited onscreen as All the Love You Cannes: An Indie's Guide to the Cannes Film Festival) is a 2002 documentary comedy film co-directed by Sean McGrath, Lloyd Kaufman and Gabriel Friedman. The film documents Troma Entertainment's annual pilgrimage to the Cannes Film Festival in order to take on what they describe as "the elitist media conglomerates" and features interviews with Quentin Tarantino and Claude Chabrol.

Troma are currently working on a follow-up, entitled Occupy Cannes.

Notes

External links
 

Cannes Film Festival
Documentary films about the film industry
2002 films
American documentary films
Films directed by Lloyd Kaufman
Troma Entertainment films
2000s English-language films
2000s American films